Orange and Blue is an album by jazz guitarist Al Di Meola that was released in 1994.

Track listing
All songs by Al Di Meola unless otherwise noted.
 "Paradisio" – 7:19
 "Chilean Pipe Song" – 4:52
 "Ta'alina Chant" (Di Meola, Noa) – 1:56
 "Orange and Blue" – 7:31
 "This Way Before" – 4:39
 "Summer Country Song" – 5:29
 "If We Meet Again, Part I" – 1:29
 "If We Meet Again, Part II" (Di Meola, Hernan Romero, Mario Parmisano) – 5:03
 "Cyprus" (Di Meola, George Dalaras, Polykarpos Kyriacou) – 3:51
 "Theme of the Mothership" (Chick Corea, Di Meola) –  5:25
 "Precious Little You" – 4:24
 "Casmir" – 4:07
 "On My Own" – 3:20

Personnel
 Al Di Meola – guitars, keyboards, drums, percussion
 Mike Pinella – trumpet
 Conrad Herwig – trombone
 Andrés Boiarsky – saxophone
 Simon Shaneen – violin
 Mario Parmisano – keyboards
 Marc Johnson – double bass
 Pino Palladino – bass guitar
 Peter Erskine – drums
 Steve Gadd – drums
 Manu Katché – drums
 Gumbi Ortiz – congas, bongo
 George Dalaras – vocals
 Noa – vocals
 Hernan Romero – vocals, guitar, synthesizers, charango, percussion

Chart performance

References

Jazz fusion albums by American artists
Al Di Meola albums
1994 albums
Tomato Records albums